Jakub Serafin (born 25 May 1996) is a Polish professional footballer who plays as a midfielder for Puszcza Niepołomice.

Club career
On 26 January 2016 he was loaned to Bytovia Bytów on a one-and-half-year deal.

On 1 August 2017 he was loaned to Haugesund. He returned to Lech Poznań after six months.

On 14 August 2020 he moved to Puszcza Niepołomice after playing for the club on loan in the 2019–20 season and signed a two-year contract.

Career statistics

Club

1 Including Polish SuperCup.

Honours

Club
Lech Poznań
 Ekstraklasa: 2014–15

References

1996 births
Sportspeople from Olsztyn
Living people
Polish footballers
Poland youth international footballers
Association football midfielders
Lech Poznań II players
Lech Poznań players
GKS Bełchatów players
Bytovia Bytów players
FK Haugesund players
MKS Cracovia (football) players
Puszcza Niepołomice players
Ekstraklasa players
I liga players
III liga players
Eliteserien players
Polish expatriate footballers
Expatriate footballers in Norway
Polish expatriate sportspeople in Norway